was a Japanese track and field athlete. She competed in the women's javelin throw at the 1936 Summer Olympics.

References

External links

1915 births
Year of death missing
Place of birth missing
Japanese female middle-distance runners
Japanese female shot putters
Japanese female javelin throwers
Olympic female javelin throwers
Olympic athletes of Japan
Athletes (track and field) at the 1936 Summer Olympics
Japan Championships in Athletics winners
20th-century Japanese women